Passage, The Passage or Le Passage may refer to:

Arts and entertainment

Films
 Passage (2008 film), a documentary about Arctic explorers
 Passage (2009 film), a short movie about three sisters
 Passage (2020 film), a Canadian documentary film,
 The Passage (1979 film), starring James Mason and Malcolm McDowell
 The Passage (1986 film), a French supernatural thriller film starring Alain Delon
 The Passage (2007 film), by Mark Heller
 The Passage (2011 film), by Roberto Minervini

Literature
The Passage (Palmer novel), a 1930 novel by Vance Palmer
 Le Passage, a 1954 French novel by Jean Reverzy
Passage (Willis novel), a 2001 science fiction novel by Connie Willis
Passage (Morley novel), a 2007 novel by John David Morley
Passage (Bujold novel), a 2008 novel by Lois McMaster Bujold
Le Passage, a 2009 novel by former French President Valéry Giscard d'Estaing
The Passage (novel series), by Justin Cronin
The Passage (Cronin novel), a 2010 novel by Justin Cronin

Music
 Passage, or section, a complete musical idea
 Passage (rapper), an alternative hip hop artist based in Oakland, California
 The Passage (band), a punk rock band from the UK

Albums
 Passage (Bloodrock album), 1972
 Passage (The Carpenters album), 1977
 Passage (The Tannahill Weavers album), 1983
 Passage (Samael album), 1996
 Passages (Ravi Shankar and Philip Glass album), 1990
 The Passage (Andy Narell album) or the title song, 2004
 Le Passage (album), a 2004 album by Jenifer Bartoli
 The Passage (DGM album) or the title song, 2016
 The Passage, by Boy Hits Car, 2005

Songs
 "Passage", a song by Vienna Teng on her 2004 album Warm Strangers
 "The Passage", a song by Bradley Joseph from the 1997 album Rapture

Television
 "The Passage" (Battlestar Galactica), a 2006 episode of the science fiction television series
 The Passage (TV series), a science fiction thriller TV series on Fox

Other uses in arts and entertainment media
 Passage (sculpture), an outdoor 2014 art installation
 Passage (video game), a 2007 computer game

Geography
 Le Passage, Isère, a commune in France
 Le Passage, Lot-et-Garonne, a commune in France
 Passage Island (disambiguation)
 Passage, 19th century English name for Pasaia, a town and municipality in Spain

Topography
 Passage, a distinct section of a cave
 Passage, or strait, a narrow channel of water that connects two larger bodies of water

Other uses
 Alley
 Passage (legislature), the process of approving a proposed law
 Passage (architecture), a long room or hall leading to other rooms
 Passage (department store), an upscale department store in Saint Petersburg, Russia
 Passage (dressage), a form of trained slow, animated trot performed by a horse
 The Passage (charity), a charity for homeless and vulnerable people in London

See also
 Passages (disambiguation)
 Passaging, in cell culture
 Rite of passage (disambiguation)
 Rites of passage (disambiguation)
 Safe Passage (disambiguation)